Henry O'Brien (April 5, 1910 – April 18, 1973) was an American cyclist. He competed at the 1928 and 1932 Summer Olympics.

References

External links
 

1910 births
1973 deaths
American male cyclists
Olympic cyclists of the United States
Cyclists at the 1928 Summer Olympics
Cyclists at the 1932 Summer Olympics
People from San Jose, California